Mnetěš (until 1922 Netěš) is a municipality and village in Litoměřice District in the Ústí nad Labem Region of the Czech Republic. It has about 600 inhabitants.

Etymology
The village was named after its founder Mnětech.

Geography
It lies in the Lower Eger Table. Říp Mountain, connected with the legend of Czech forefather, is located in the municipal territory.

History
The first written mention of Mnetěš is in a deed of Ottokar I of Bohemia from 1226. From 1603 until the 19th century, it was owned by the Lobkowicz family.

Transport
The D8 motorway runs through the municipality.

Sights
The most important building is the Rotunda of Saint George on the top of Říp, protected as a national cultural monument. It was built around 1039 and it is one of the oldest preserved Romanesque buildings in the country. The church was extended and consecrated in 1126, the entrance was moved in 1869–1881.

References

External links

Rotunda of Saint George

Villages in Litoměřice District